Xubuntu is a Canonical Ltd.–recognized, community-maintained derivative of the Ubuntu operating system. The name Xubuntu is a portmanteau of Xfce and Ubuntu, as it uses the Xfce desktop environment, instead of Ubuntu's customized GNOME desktop.

Xubuntu seeks to provide "a light, stable and configurable desktop environment with conservative workflows" using Xfce components. Xubuntu is intended for both new and experienced Linux users. Rather than explicitly targeting low-powered machines, it attempts to provide "extra responsiveness and speed" on existing hardware.

History

Xubuntu was originally intended to be released at the same time as Ubuntu 5.10 Breezy Badger, 13 October 2005, but the work was not complete by that date. Instead the Xubuntu name was used for the xubuntu-desktop metapackage available through the Synaptic Package Manager which installed the Xfce desktop.

The first official Xubuntu release, led by Jani Monoses, appeared on 1 June 2006, as part of the Ubuntu 6.06 Dapper Drake line, which also included Kubuntu and Edubuntu.

Cody A.W. Somerville developed a comprehensive strategy for the Xubuntu project named the Xubuntu Strategy Document. This document was approved by the Ubuntu Community Council in 2008.

In February 2009 Mark Shuttleworth agreed that an official LXDE version of Ubuntu, Lubuntu, would be developed. The LXDE desktop uses the Openbox window manager and, like Xubuntu, is intended to be a low-system-requirement, low-RAM environment for netbooks, mobile devices and older PCs and will compete with Xubuntu in that niche.

In November 2009, Cody A.W. Somerville stepped down as the project leader and made a call for nominations to help find a successor. Lionel Le Folgoc was confirmed by the Xubuntu community as the new project leader on 10 January 2010 and requested the formation of an official Xubuntu council. , discussions regarding the future of Xubuntu's governance and the role a council might play in it were still ongoing.

In March 2012 Charlie Kravetz, a former Xubuntu project leader, formally resigned from the project. Despite this, the project members indicated that Xubuntu 12.04 would go ahead as scheduled.

In the beginning of 2016, the Xubuntu team began the process to transition the project to become council run rather than having a single project leader. On 1 January 2017, an official post on the Xubuntu site's blog announced the official formation of the Xubuntu Council. The purpose of the council is not just to make decisions about the future of the project, but to make sure the direction of the project adheres to guidelines established in the Strategy Document.

Performance
The Xfce desktop environment is intended to use fewer system resources than the default Ubuntu GNOME desktop. In September 2010, the Xubuntu developers claimed that the minimum RAM Xubuntu could be run on was 128 MB, with 256 MB of RAM strongly recommended at that time.

Testing conducted by Martyn Honeyford at IBM in January 2007 on Xubuntu 6.10 concluded that it "uses approximately 25MB less application memory, and also eats significantly less into buffers and cache (which may imply that there is less file activity) than Ubuntu".

Later testing showed that Xubuntu was at a disadvantage compared to Debian equipped with the Xfce desktop. Tests were conducted by DistroWatch on a Dell Dimension 4500 desktop machine, with an Intel 2 GHz processor and 384 MB of memory in April 2009, that compared Xubuntu 9.04 against an Xfce desktop version of Debian 5.0.1. These showed that Xubuntu used more than twice the RAM as Debian in simple tasks. Xubuntu also ran out of RAM doing everyday tasks, indicating that 384 MB of RAM was inadequate. The review concluded "It was obvious I had already run out of RAM and was starting to use swap space. Considering I wasn't doing very much, this was rather disappointing". Subsequent experimentation by Distrowatch concluded that the performance advantages observed in Debian were due to Xubuntu's inclusion of memory-hungry software not present in Debian's implementation of Xfce.

In a September 2009 assessment in Linux Magazine, Christopher Smart noted, "the Xfce desktop is very lightweight and well suited to machines with small amounts of memory and processing power, but Xubuntu's implementation has essentially massacred it. They've taken the beautifully lightweight desktop and strangled it with various heavyweight components from GNOME. In all fairness to the project however, they do not claim that Xubuntu is designed for older machines – that's just something the community has assumed on their own. It might be more lightweight than Ubuntu itself, but if so it's not by much".

Subsequent reviewers emphasized Xubuntu's perceived deficiencies in performance to highlight Lubuntu, a project with similar goals but using the LXDE desktop environment (now LXQt) as opposed to Xfce. For instance, Damien Oh of Make Tech Easier noted in May 2010, "So what about Xubuntu? isn't it supposed to be the lightweight equivalent of Ubuntu? Sadly, that is a thing of the past. The truth is, the supposed lightweight equivalent is not lightweight at all. While Xubuntu is using the lightweight XFCE desktop environment, it had been  down by several heavyweight applications and also the integration with GNOME desktop also makes it lose its advantage".

However, another reviewer, Laura Tucker also from Make Tech Easier, in her 2016 article What OS Are You Using and Why? as survey of her writing team's computers, noted that Xubuntu is the favourite OS of one member of her team for her older desktop computer, as the writer reported, "because it is lightweight and works great". She also noted that it is easy to customize.

In July 2019, Jeff Mitchell of Make Tech Easier recommended Xubuntu as one option to speed up a Linux PC.

Releases

Xubuntu 6.06 LTS

The first official stand-alone release of Xubuntu was version 6.06 long term support (LTS), which was made available on 1 June 2006.

It was introduced with the statement:

The version used Linux kernel 2.6.15.7 and Xfce 4.4 beta 1. Applications included the Thunar file manager, GDM desktop manager, Abiword word processor and Gnumeric spread sheet, Evince PDF document viewer, Xarchiver archive manager, Xfburn CD burner, Firefox 1.5.0.3 web browser, Thunderbird 1.5.0.2 email client and the GDebi package manager.

Caitlyn Martin reviewed Xubuntu 6.06 in June 2006. She singled out its "bare bones approach" to the applications included, indicating that she would rather add applications she wanted than clean out ones she didn't want. On her aging laptop Xubuntu 6.06 proved faster than Fedora Core 5. She stated that: "Under Fedora when I opened a couple of rather resource intensive applications, for example Open Office and Seamonkey, the system would begin to drag. While these apps still take a moment to get started on Xubuntu they are crisp and responsive and don't seem to slow anything else down. I never expected this sort of performance and that alone made Xubuntu an instant favorite of mine". She had praise for the Thunar file manager, as light and fast. She concluded: "Overall I am impressed and Xubuntu, for the moment anyway, is my favorite Linux distribution despite a few rough edges, probably largely due to the use of a beta desktop".

Xubuntu 6.10

Xubuntu 6.10 was released on 26 October 2006. This version used Xfce 4.4 beta 2 and included Upstart, the Firefox 2.0 web browser, the Gaim 2.0.0 beta 3.1 instant messaging client along with new versions of AbiWord and Gnumeric. The media player was gxine which replaced Xfmedia. The previous xffm4 file manager was replaced by Thunar. It introduced redesigned artwork for the bootup splash screen, the login window and the desktop theme.

The developers claimed that this version of Xubuntu could run on 64 MB of RAM, with 128 MB "strongly recommended".

Reviewer Caitlyn Martin tested Xubuntu on a four-year-old Toshiba Satellite 1805-S204 laptop, with a 1 GHz Celeron processor and 512 MB of RAM in December 2006. She noted that Xubuntu ran faster than GNOME or KDE, which she described as "sluggish" and rated it as one of the two fastest distributions on her limited test hardware, placing with Vector Linux. She found the graphical installer to be less than acceptable and the text-based installer better. She concluded:

Xubuntu 7.04

Xubuntu 7.04 was released on 19 April 2007. This release was based on Xfce 4.4.

Michael Larabel of Phoronix carried out detailed benchmark testing of betas for Ubuntu 7.04, Kubuntu 7.04 and Xubuntu 7.04 in February 2007 on two different computers, one with dual Intel Clovertown processors and the other with an AMD Sempron. After a series of gzip compression, LAME compilation, and LAME encoding tasks he concluded, "in these tests with the dual Clovertown setup we found the results to be indistinguishable. However, with the AMD Sempron, Ubuntu 7.04 Feisty Fawn Herd 4 had outperformed both Kubuntu and the lighter-weight Xubuntu. Granted on a slower system the lightweight Xubuntu should have a greater performance advantage".

In one Review Linux look at Xubuntu 7.04 it was faulted for not including OpenOffice.org. The reviewer noted: "If you do decide to keep the default software, it will cover your basic needs. Xubuntu comes with light weight desktop in XFCE 4.4 and also less tasking programs. If you are thinking that OpenOffice will come pre-installed on your desktop, you will be greatly surprised as AbiWord and Gnumeric are your default processor and spreadsheet program". He indicated though that installing applications from the repositories was easy and made for simple customization of an installation.

Xubuntu 7.10

Xubuntu 7.10 was released on 18 October 2007. It was based upon Xfce, 4.4.1 and added updated translations along with a new theme, MurrinaStormCloud, using the Murrine Engine.

Application updates included Pidgin 2.2.0, (Gaim was renamed Pidgin) and GIMP 2.4. This Xubuntu version allowed the installation of Firefox extensions and plug-ins through the Add/Remove Software interface.

The developers claimed that this version of Xubuntu could run on 64 MB of RAM, with 128 MB "strongly recommended".

In a review of the release candidate for Xubuntu 7.10 that was installed on a Pentium 2 300 Celeron with 256 MB of RAM, equipped with an nVidia GeForce 4 64 MB video card, Review Linux noted that "the system was very fast".

Review Linux positioned Xubuntu and its role, "The main difference between Xubuntu and Ubuntu is the fact that Xubuntu is a little lighter on system requirements and it uses Xfce as  desktop. Xubuntu is perfect for that old computer just lying around in your basement".

Xubuntu 8.04 LTS

Xubuntu 8.04 Long Term Support (LTS) was made available on 24 April 2008. This version of Xubuntu used Xfce 4.4.2, Xorg 7.3 and Linux kernel 2.6.24. It introduced PolicyKit for permissions control, PulseAudio and a new printing manager. It also introduced Wubi, that allowed Windows users to install Xubuntu as a program on Windows.

Applications included were Firefox 3 Beta 5, Brasero CD/DVD burning application, Transmission BitTorrent client, Mousepad text editor, AbiWord word processor and Ristretto image viewer

Reviewer Christopher Dawson of ZDNet installed Xubuntu 8.04 on a Dell Latitude C400 with 512 MB of RAM, a 30GB hard drive and a 1 GHz Pentium III-M processor. He noted it provided better performance than the Windows XP Pro it replaced. He concluded: "This is where Xubuntu really shines… What it will do is take some very moderate hardware and provide a solid, reliable, and relatively snappy machine for a user with productivity needs or who accesses terminal services".

Xubuntu 8.10

Xubuntu 8.10 was released on 30 October 2008. This version of Xubuntu brought a new version of Abiword, version 2.6.4, the Listen Multimedia Player and introduced the Catfish desktop search application. It used Linux kernel 2.6.27, X.Org 7.4. There was an installation option of an encrypted private directory using ecryptfs-utils. The Totem media player was included.

Darren Yates, an Australian IT journalist, was very positive about Xubuntu 8.10, particularly for netbooks, which were at their peak of popularity then, dismissing "ubuntu itself is nothing flash". He said, "One of the disappointing things about the arrival of netbooks in Australia has been the decline of Linux in the face of an enslaught by Microsoft to push Windows XP Home Edition back into the market. It's sad because Xubuntu is the ideal Linux distro for these devices. While the latest Xubuntu 8.10 distro lacks drivers for WiFi wireless networking and in many cases also the built-in webcams, those drivers do exist and incorporating them inside Xubuntu would neither be difficult or take up much space".

Xubuntu 9.04

Version 9.04 was released on 23 April 2009. The development team advertised this release as giving improved boot-up times, "benefiting from the Ubuntu core developer team's improvements to boot-time code, the Xubuntu 9.04 desktop boots more quickly than ever. This means you can spend less time waiting, and more time being productive with your Xubuntu desktop".

Xubuntu 9.04 used Xfce 4.6, which included a new Xfce Settings Manager dialog, the new Xconf configuration system, an improved desktop menu and clock, new notifications, and remote file system application Gigolo.

This release also brought all new artwork and incorporated the Murrina Storm Cloud GTK+ theme and a new XFWM4 window manager theme. 9.04 also introduced new versions of many applications, including the AbiWord word processor, Brasero CD/DVD burner and Mozilla Thunderbird e-mail client. It used X.Org server 1.6. The default file system was ext3, but ext4 was an option at installation.

In testing Xubuntu 9.04, Distrowatch determined that Xubuntu used more than twice the system memory as Debian 5.0.1 Xfce and that while loading the desktop the memory usage was ten times higher. DistoWatch attributed this to Xubuntu's use of Ubuntu desktop environment services, including the graphical package manager and updater, network manager, power manager, and proprietary driver manager. They provided a plan to strip it down and reduce its memory footprint.

DistroWatch concluded "Xubuntu is a great distribution, but its default selection of packages does not necessarily suit itself to low-memory systems".

In reviewing Xubuntu in May 2009, Linux.com writer Rob Reilly said, "The latest Xubuntu distribution has just about the right mix of speed and power" and concluded "for the new Linux user, Xubuntu is an easy to use version of Ubuntu that is fast, simple, and reliable. Experienced or "get it done" types will appreciate the minimalist approach, that can be beefed up to whatever degree that is needed".

Xubuntu 9.10

29 October 2009 saw the release of Xubuntu 9.10, which utilized Xfce 4.6.1, Linux kernel 2.6.31 and by default the ext4 file system and GRUB 2. This release included the Exaile 0.3.0 music player, the Xfce4 power manager replaced the Gnome Power Manager and improved desktop notifications using notify-osd. Upstart boot-up speed was improved.

The release promised "faster application load times and reduced memory footprint for a number of your favorite Xfce4 applications thanks to improvements in library linking provided by ld's --as-needed flag".

Dedoimedo gave Xubuntu a negative review, saying "When it comes to usability, Xubuntu has a lot to desire. While Xubuntu is based on Ubuntu, which is definitely one of the friendlier, simpler and more intuitive distros around, a core elements that has led to Ubuntu stardom, the integration of the Xfce desktop makes for a drastic change compared to stock edition. The usability is seriously marred, in several critical categories. And it gets worse. Losing functionality is one thing. Trying to restore it and ending with an unusable desktop is another". The review concluded "Sadly, Xubuntu is a no go. It's not what it ought to be. What more, it does injustice to the Ubuntu family, which usually delivers useful solutions, mainly to new Linux users. There were horrendous, glaring problems with Xubuntu that kicked me back to Linux not so usable 2005. I was taken by surprise, totally not expecting that an ultra-modern distro would pull such dirty, antiquated tricks up its sleeve".

Xubuntu 10.04 LTS

Xubuntu 10.04 Long Term Support (LTS) was released on 29 April 2010. It moved to PulseAudio and replaced the Xsane scanner utilities with Simple Scan. It also incorporated the Ubuntu Software Center, which had been introduced in Ubuntu 9.10, to replace the old Add/Remove Software utility. The included spreadsheet application, Gnumeric was updated to version 1.10.1 and new games were introduced. Because of incompatibilities in the gnome-screensaver screensaver application, it was replaced by xscreensaver. The default theme was an updated version of Albatross, designed by the Shimmer Team.

This version of Xubuntu officially required a 700 MHz x86 processor, 128 MB of RAM, with 256 MB RAM "strongly recommended" and 3 GB of disk space.

In reviewing Xubuntu 10.04 beta 1 in April 2010, Joey Sneddon of OMG Ubuntu, declared it "borderline irrelevant". He noted that it provided few performance advantages over Ubuntu. In testing it against Ubuntu and Lubuntu on a 1 GB RAM, 2 GHz Single core processor computer with a 128 MB video card, RAM usage with 3 tabs open in Firefox, 1 playing an HTML5 YouTube video was:

Ubuntu Beta 1: 222 MB
Xubuntu Beta 1: 215.8 MiB
Lubuntu Beta 1: 137 MB

Sneddon points out that from this testing that Xubuntu is barely more "lean" than Ubuntu and concludes "Xubuntu, whilst of interest to those who prefer the XFCE environment, remains an unremarkable spin from the Ubuntu canon that, for most users, is largely irrelevant".

Jim Lynch of Desktop Linux Reviews praised Xubuntu 10.04's fast boot time and its incorporation of the Ubuntu Software Center, but criticized the lack of inclusion of Ubuntu One.

Xubuntu 10.10

Xubuntu 10.10 was released on 10 October 2010. It included Parole, the Xfce4 media player, XFBurn CD/DVD writer in place of Brasero and Xfce4-taskmanager replaced Gnome-Task-Manager. These changes were all to lighten the release's memory footprint. AbiWord was updated to version 2.8.6 and Gnumeric to 1.10.8. This release also introduced the Bluebird theme, from the Shimmer Team.

This version of Xubuntu required 192 MB of RAM to run the standard live CD or to install it. The alternate installation CD required 64 MB of RAM to install Xubuntu. Either CD required 2.0 GB of free hard disk space. Once installed, Xubuntu 10.10 could run with as little as 128 MB of RAM, but the developers strongly recommended a minimum of 256 MB of RAM.

In reviewing Xubuntu 10.10 in October 2010, just after it was released, Jim Lynch of Eye on Linux said, "I had no problems using Xubuntu 10.10. My system was very stable; I didn't notice any application crashes or system burps. Xubuntu 10.10 is also very fast; applications opened and close very quickly. There was no noticeable system lag or sluggishness. The new theme Bluebird is attractive without being garish; it fits in well with Xubuntu's minimalist mission".

Christopher Tozzi, writing about Xubuntu 10.10 beta in August 2010, noted that the distribution was shedding its Gnome dependencies and adopting lighter weight alternatives. He noted "it's encouraging to see more uniqueness in the distribution, especially given the uncertain future of the Gnome-Ubuntu relationship as the release of Gnome 3.0 approaches".

Xubuntu 11.04

Xubuntu 11.04 was released on 28 April 2011. This version was based upon Xfce 4.8 and introduced editable menus using any menu editor that meets the freedesktop.org standards. This version also introduced a new Elementary Xubuntu icon theme, the Droid font by default and an updated installation slide show.

While Ubuntu 11.04 introduced the new default Unity interface, Xubuntu did not adopt Unity and instead retained its existing Xfce interface. Although the developers have decided to retain a minimalist interface, Xubuntu 11.04 has a new dock-like application launcher to achieve a more modern look.

Xubuntu 11.04 could be installed with one of 2 CDs. The Xubuntu 11.04 standard CD requires 4.4 GB of hard disk space and 256 MB of RAM to install, while the alternate CD, which uses a text-based installer, requires 64 MB of RAM and 2 GB of disk space for installation and provides additional options. Once installed, Xubuntu 11.04 can run with 256 MB of RAM, but 512 MB is "strongly recommended".

In reviewing Xubuntu 11.04, Jim Lynch of Desktop Linux Reviews faulted the release for its lack of LibreOffice, its dull default wallpaper and the default automatic hiding of the bottom panel. In praising the release he said "Xubuntu 11.04 is a good choice for minimalists who prefer a desktop environment not bogged down with pointless eye-candy. It should work well on older or slower hardware. It's also a good option for those who dislike Unity and want a different desktop environment. Xfce is simple, fast and doesn't get in your way when you are trying to quickly launch an application or otherwise find something. And those who decide to use Xubuntu still remain in the Ubuntu family without the headache of dealing with Unity. So if you're a Unity resister, you should definitely check out Xubuntu 11.04".

Joe Brockmeier of Linux.com in reviewing Xubuntu 11.04, praised the inclusion of AbiWord and Gnumeric over LibreOffice, as well as the Catfish file search utility. He added, "Though I've usually used the mainline Ubuntu release when I use Ubuntu, I have to say that I really like the latest iteration of Xubuntu. It does a great job of showcasing Xfce while providing a unique desktop that gives all the pluses of Ubuntu while still being a bit more like a traditional Linux desktop".

As of the Xubuntu 11.04 release the developers now "strongly recommend" 512 MB of RAM to use Xubuntu. However, at least 1 GB of memory is recommended to "get a smooth experience when running multiple applications parallel on the desktop".

Xubuntu 11.10

Xubuntu 11.10 was released on 13 October 2011, the same day that Ubuntu 11.10 was released.

In this release gThumb became the new image viewer/organizer, Leafpad replaced Mousepad as the default text editor and LightDM was introduced as the log-in manager. The release also incorporated pastebinit for cut and paste actions.

In reviewing Xubuntu 11.10 on the Acer eM350 netbook, Michael Reed of Linux Journal noted the extensive hardware support out of the box, attractive theme and good performance on 1 GB of RAM. He did remark on the inferior Adobe Flash performance compared to the Windows version of Flash, particularly in full screen mode, something common to all Linux Flash installations as well as the lack of native support for Samba networking, although he was quickly able to install this. Reed concluded "my overall assessment was that Xubuntu 11.10 was a better fit than Windows XP on this netbook. Being fair, one has to remember that XP is now ten years old. Xfce is going to get better and better, and it's already very comprehensive. There is a growing contingent of users for whom the direction that KDE4 and Gnome 3 have taken doesn't ring true, and increasingly, Xfce is going to be the first choice for them".

In reviewing 11.10, Brian Masinick of IT Toolbox praised its low RAM usage and said the "Xubuntu 11.10 release is a fresh relief for those who simply want a nice, functional system. Xubuntu 11.10 delivers, and excels in providing a functional, no frills or surprises, responsive, and usable desktop system".

Xubuntu 12.04 LTS

Xubuntu 12.04 was released on 26 April 2012. It was a Long Term Support release and was supported for three years, until April 2016. This contrasts with Edubuntu, Kubuntu and Ubuntu 12.04 which, while also LTS releases, were all supported for five years.

Xubuntu 12.04 incorporated many changes including some default shortcuts which were altered and new ones added, plus there were many appearance changes, including a new logo and wallpaper. Fixes were included for Greybird, Ubiquity, Plymouth, LightDM, and Terminal themes.

The release shipped with version 3.2.14 of the Linux kernel. Pavucontrol was introduced to replace xfce4-mixer as it did not support PulseAudio. The Alacarte menu editor was used by default.

The minimum system requirements for this release were 512 MiB of RAM, 5 GB of hard disk space, and a graphics card and monitor capable of at least 800×600 pixel resolution.

Whisker Menu, a new application launcher for Xubuntu, was introduced via a Personal Package Archive for Xubuntu 12.04 LTS. It proved a popular option and later became the default launcher in Xubuntu 14.04 LTS.

Xubuntu 12.10

Xubuntu 12.10 was released on 18 October 2012. This release introduced the use of Xfce 4.10, as well as new versions of Catfish, Parole, LightDM, Greybird and the Ubiquity slideshow. The application menu was slightly reorganized, with settings-related launchers moved to the Settings Manager. The release also included updated artwork, new desktop wallpaper, a new look to the documentation and completely rewritten offline documentation. On 32-bit systems, hardware supporting PAE is required.

The release included one notable bug fix: "No more window traces or "black on black" in installer".

This release of Xubuntu does not support UEFI Secure Boot, unlike Ubuntu 12.10, which allows Ubuntu to run on hardware designed for Windows 8. It was expected that this feature would be included in the next release of Xubuntu.

Xubuntu 12.10 includes Linux kernel 3.5.5, Python 3.2 and OpenJDK7 as the default Java implementation.

The minimum system requirements for this release of Xubuntu are 512 MB of system memory (RAM), 5 GB of disk space and a graphics card and monitor capable of at least 800×600 pixels resolution.

Xubuntu 13.04

Xubuntu 13.04 was released on 25 April 2013. It was intended as a maintenance release with few new features. It incorporated updated documentation, a new version of Catfish (0.6.1), updates to the Greybird theme, GIMP and Gnumeric were reintroduced, a new version of Parole (0.5.0) and that duplicate partitions are no longer shown on desktop or in the Thunar file manager.

This was the first version of Xubuntu with a support period of 9 months for the interim (non-LTS) releases, instead of 18 months.

Starting with this release the Xubuntu ISO images will not fit on a CD as they now average 800 MB. The new image target media is at least a 1.0 GB USB device or DVD. The decision to change the ISO image size was based upon the amount of developer time spent trying to shrink the files to fit them on a standard size CD. This ISO size change also allowed the inclusion of two applications that had been previously dropped due to space constraints, Gnumeric and GIMP.

Xubuntu 13.10

Xubuntu 13.10 was released on 17 October 2013. This release included some improvements over the previous release, including a new version of xfce4-settings and a new dialog box for display settings. There was also a new color theme tool and gtk-theme-config was added as default. This release also included new wallpaper, new GTK+ themes, with Gtk3.10 support and the LightDM greeter. The official Xubuntu documentation was also updated.

In reviewing Xubuntu 13.10, Jim Lynch stated: "Xubuntu 13.10, like its cousin Lubuntu 13.10, is a great choice if you're a minimalist. It's fast, stable and offers many of the advantages of Ubuntu 13.10 without the Unity experience (or torture, depending on your perspective)".

Xubuntu 14.04 LTS

Xubuntu 14.04 LTS was released on 17 April 2014 and, being an LTS, featured three years of support. It incorporated the Xfdesktop 4.11, the Mugshot user account profile editor, the MenuLibre menu editor in place of Alacarte and the Light-locker screen lock to replace Xscreensaver. The Whisker Menu was introduced as the default application launching menu, having been formerly a Personal Package Archive option introduced in Xubuntu 12.04 LTS. It replaced the previous default menu system. The Xfdesktop also supported using different wallpapers on each workspace.

Jim Lynch reviewed Xubuntu 14.04 LTS and concluded: "I've always been a fan of Xubuntu as I tend to go for lightweight desktops versus ones with a lot more glitz and features. So I was quite pleased with Xubuntu 14.04. It's true that you aren't going to find tons of earth shattering features in this release, and that's fine because it's a long term support release anyway. I never expect new feature overload in LTS releases since the emphasis is on stability and polish. But Xubuntu 14.04 LTS is a definite improvement from the last version. The overall experience has been polished up significantly, and there are some small but useful features added like Mugshot, Light Locker and MenuLibre, and of course Whiskermenu".

Xubuntu 14.10

Xubuntu 14.10 was released on 23 October 2014. This release incorporated very few new features. Changed were a new Xfce Power Manager plugin added to the panel and that items in the new alt-tab dialog could be clicked with the mouse. To illustrate the customization of the operating system, 14.10 featured pink highlight colours, something that could easily be changed by users, if desired.

Silviu Stahie, writing for Softpedia stated: "Xubuntu releases are usually very quiet and we rarely see them overshadowing the Ubuntu base, but this is exactly what happened this time around. The devs have made a number of very important modifications and improvements, but they have also changed a very important aspect of the desktop, at least for the duration of the support of the distribution…The devs figured that it might be a good idea to show just how easy is to change things in the distribution…To be fair, this is the kind of change that you either love or hate, but fortunately for the users, it's very easy to return to default".

Xubuntu 15.04

Xubuntu 15.04 was released on 23 April 2015. This release featured Xfce 4.12 and included new colour schemes, with redundant File Manager (Settings) menu entries removed. Otherwise this release was predominantly a bug-fix and package upgrade release, with very few significant changes.

Marius Nestor of Softpedia noted, "The biggest feature of the newly announced Xubuntu 15.04 distro is the integration of the Xfce 4.12 desktop environment…Among other highlights…we can mention new and updated Xubuntu Light and Dark color schemes in the Mousepad and Terminal applications, but the former is now using the Xubuntu Light theme by default…Additionally, the distribution now offers better appearance for Qt applications, which will work out of the box using Xubuntu's GTK+ theme by default and removes the redundant File Manager (Settings) menu entry".

Xubuntu 15.10

Xubuntu 15.10 was released on 22 October 2015.

This release had only minimal changes over 15.04. It incorporated the Xfce4 Panel Switch for the backup and restoration of panels and included five preset panel layouts. Greybird accessibility icons were used for the window manager. Gnumeric and Abiword were replaced with LibreOffice Calc and LibreOffice Writer and a new default LibreOffice theme, libreoffice-style-elementary, was provided.

Joey Sneddon of OMG Ubuntu described Xubuntu 15.10 as incorporating only "a modest set of changes".

Xubuntu 16.04 LTS

Released on 21 April 2016, Xubuntu 16.04 is an LTS version, supported for three years until April 2019.

This release offered few new features. It included a new package of wallpapers and the replacement of the Ubuntu Software Center with Gnome Software, the same as in Ubuntu 16.04 LTS. Reviewer Jack Wallen said, "The truth of the matter is, the Ubuntu Software Center has been a horrible tool for a very long time. Making this move will greatly improve the Ubuntu experience for every user".

The selection of wallpapers available in Xubuntu 16.04 LTS was singled out by OMG Ubuntu as "all breathtakingly beautiful".

The first point release, 16.04.1, was released on 21 July 2016. The release of Xubuntu 16.04.2 was delayed a number of times, but it was eventually released on 17 February 2017. Xubuntu 16.04.3 was released on 3 August 2017. Xubuntu 16.04.4 was delayed from 15 February 2018 and released on 1 March 2018. Xubuntu 16.04.5 is scheduled for release on 2 August 2018.

Xubuntu 16.10

Xubuntu 16.10 was released on 13 October 2016.

This version of Xubuntu introduced very few new features. The official release notice stated, "This release has seen little visible change since April's 16.04, however much has been done towards supplying Xubuntu with Xfce packages built with GTK3, including the porting of many plugins and Xfce Terminal to GTK3".

Reviewer Joey Sneddon of OMG Ubuntu!noted, "Xubuntu 16.10 has only a modest change log version [over] its April LTS release".

In reviewing Xubuntu 16.10, Gary Newell of Everyday Linux said, "Xubuntu has always been one of my favourite distributions. It doesn't look as glamourous as some of the other Linux offerings out there and it certainly doesn't come with all the software you need pre-installed. The thing that Xubuntu gives you is a great base to start from…The truth is that nothing much really changes with Xubuntu. It is solid, steady and it doesn't need to change…" He did fault the installation of some software packages, which don't appear in the graphical software tools, but can be installed from the command line.

Xubuntu 17.04

Xubuntu 17.04 was released on 13 April 2017.

Joey Sneddon of OMG Ubuntu indicated that this release is mostly just bug fixes and has little in the way of new features.

Xubuntu 17.10

Xubuntu 17.10 was released on 19 October 2017.

This release included only minor changes including the GNOME Font Viewer included by default and that the client side decorations consume less space within the Greybird GTK+ theme.

Distrowatch noted that Xubuntu 17.10, "includes significant improvements to accelerated video playback on Intel video cards. The distribution also includes support for driverless printing and includes the GNOME Font Viewer by default".

Reviewer Joey Sneddon of OMG Ubuntu said of this release, "Xubuntu 17.10 is another iterative release, featuring only modest changes (if it ain't broke, don't fix it)".

Xubuntu 18.04 LTS

Xubuntu 18.04 is a long-term support version, released on 26 April 2018.

In this version, removed the GTK Theme Configuration, the Greybird GTK+ theme was upgraded to 3.22.8 version, including HiDPI support, Google Chrome GTK+ 3 styles and a new dark theme. Sound Indicator was replaced by the Xfce PulseAudio Plugin. The release introduced a new plugin for the panel, xfce4-notifyd. Also Evince was replaced by Atril, GNOME File Roller by Engrampa, and GNOME Calculator by MATE Calculator.

The recommended system requirements for this release are at least 1 GB of RAM and at least 20 GB of free hard disk space.

Igor Ljubuncic from Dedoimedo wrote review of Xubuntu 18.04:

Xubuntu 18.10

Xubuntu 18.10 was released on 18 October 2018. This release includes Xfce components at version 4.13 as the project moves towards a Gtk+3-only desktop, Xfce Icon Theme 0.13, Greybird 3.22.9, which improves the window manager appearance, a new purple wallpaper.

The recommended system requirements for this release remained as at least 1 GB of RAM and at least 20 GB of free hard disk space.

Igor Ljubuncic from Dedoimedo wrote a review in which he stated, "Xubuntu 18.10 Cosmic Cuttlefish is a pretty standard, run-of-the-mill distro, without any superb features or amazing wow effect. It kind of works, the defaults are somewhat boring, and you need to manually tweak things to get a lively, upbeat feel".

Xubuntu 19.04

Xubuntu 19.04 was released on 18 April 2019. Starting with this version, Xubuntu no longer offered 32-bit ISOs.

In this release, new default applications were included, such as GIMP, LibreOffice Impress. LibreOffice Draw and AptURL, and Orage was removed.

This release was predominantly a bug fix release with few changes, but also included new screenshot tools and updated Xfce 4.13 components, using components from the development branch for Xfce 4.14.

A review in Full Circle magazine concluded: "Xubuntu 19.04 is a strong release. It is pretty much flawless as a desktop OS, which really is to be expected for a 27th release. It provides a simple and elegant experience for users that allows them to get work done. No flash or splash, just a very mature distribution that gets incrementally better with each release"

Igor Ljubuncic wrote a review in Dedoimedo, in which he concluded, "Xubuntu 19.04 Disco Dingo is a fairly decent release for the bi-annual non-LTS testbed. It's stable enough, sort of mature bordering on boring, fast when it needs to be, pretty when you make it, and gives a relatively rounded overall experience. But then, it also falls short in quite a few areas. These look more like nuggets of apathy than deliberate omissions – networking woes with Samba and Bluetooth, customization struggle, less than adequate battery life, some odd niggles here and there. It just feels like a tickbox exercise rather than a beautiful fruit of labor, passion and fun. It is somewhat better than Cosmic, but it's nowhere near as exciting as Xfce (or rather Xubuntu) used to be three years back. 7/10, and worth testing, but don't crank your adrenaline pump too high".

Xubuntu 19.10

This standard release was the last one before the next LTS release and arrived on 17 October 2019.

This release included Xfce 4.14, which was completed in August 2019 after nearly four and half years of development work. Other changes included the Xfce Screensaver replacing Light Locker for screen locking, new desktop keyboard shortcuts, the ZFS file system and logical volume manager included on an experimental basis for root.

In a lengthy review on DistroWatch, Jesse Smith wrote, "I feel I do not get to say this often enough: this distribution is boring in the best possible way. Even with new, experimental filesystem support and a complete shift in the libraries used to power the Xfce desktop, Xubuntu is beautifully stable, fast, and easy to navigate … Perhaps what I appreciated most about Xubuntu was that it did not distract me or get in the way at all. I did not see a notification or a pop-up or welcome screen during my trial. The distribution just installed and got out of my way so I could start working… On the whole I am impressed with Xubuntu 19.10. I found myself wishing this was an LTS release as I would like to put this version on several computers, particular those of family members who run Linux on laptops. Xubuntu is providing a great balance between new features, stability, performance, and options and I highly recommend it for almost any desktop scenario".

A review in Full Circle magazine in November 2019 criticized the window theming and the default wallpaper, terming it "dull and uninspired". The review also noted, "with 28 releases, Xubuntu is a very mature operating system. It provides users with a solid, stable, elegant desktop experience that is quick to learn and very easy to use. Mostly it lacks unnecessary flash and bling, and instead stays out of the way and lets users get work done and very efficiently, too. Xubuntu 19.10 is a release that brings small, incremental changes, with updates and polish that all bode very well for a good, solid spring 2020 LTS release".

Xubuntu 20.04 LTS

This release is a long-term support release and was released on 23 April 2020. Xubuntu 20.04.1 LTS was released on 6 August 2020.

As in common with LTS releases, this one introduced very few new features. A new dark-colored windowing theme was included, Greybird-dark, as were six new community-submitted wallpaper designs. The applications apt-offline and pidgin-libnotify were not included and Python 2 support was removed.

A review of this release in Debug Point concluded, "this release is another significant milestone for Xubuntu 20.04 LTS among other popular Ubuntu-based distributions. Xubuntu 20.04 managed to bring the latest to its users who are still using older hardware and devices with its offerings".

DistroWatch reviewer Jeff Siegel gave this release a positive review, noting that Xubuntu is often undervalued. He wrote, "Xubuntu has always been the quiet middle child in the Ubuntu family, the one that was always overlooked in favour of its older siblings, the glitzy Kubuntu and the rock star Ubuntu – and even for the younger ones, like the oh so retro Ubuntu MATE. All Xubuntu has ever done is offer a solid, dependable, mostly error-free, long-term release every two years. Given a world of Linux distro hoppers, Plasma desktop, and extras like the GNOME and MX Linux tweak tools, and the Zorin browser chooser, who needs something like Xubuntu? A lot of us. We value the distro's dependability and continuity, its lack of controversy, and that it just works, almost and always, straight out of the box. In this, Xubuntu 20.04, Focal Fossa, continues the distro's tradition".

Igor Ljubuncic from Dedoimedo reviewed the release in May 2020, writing: "Xubuntu 20.04 Focal Fossa is not a release worth its long-term support badge. It's not exciting, it has ergonomic problems, it has bugs, and it offers a lethargic experience. There's really no sense of pride. Inertia only. If we look at dry facts, you get an average score across the board. Some problems in pretty much every aspect. Things work, but it's a bare minimum. The sweet momentum that was, back in 2017 or so, gone. Well, there you go. Hopefully, the results will improve over time, but I'm doubtful. I've not seen anything really cool or fresh in the Xfce desktop per se for a while now. Xubuntu could work for those looking for a very spartan XP-like experience".

A Full Circle review concluded, "Xubuntu 20.04 LTS is the Long Term Support release that Xubuntu fans have been waiting for. This 29th Xubuntu release is graceful in design, stable, and simple to use. New users will find that it comes with most of the software needed to get straight to productive work. Experienced Xubuntu users will find this LTS release very familiar, just an update without any unwelcome surprises, but with three year's worth of support. If it had some better default window themes it would be just about perfect".

Xubuntu 20.10

This standard release was made on 22 October 2020.

The Xubuntu developers transitioned their code base to GitHub for this release and otherwise there were no changes over Xubuntu 20.04 LTS.

On 23 October 2020, reviewer Sarvottam Kumar of FOSS Bytes noted of this release, "out of all Ubuntu flavors, Xubuntu 20.10 seems the least updated variant containing the same Xfce 4.14 desktop environment as long-term Xubuntu 20.04 has. This is because the next Xfce 4.16 is still under development, with the first preview released last month".

A Full Circle Magazine review concluded: "even though Xubuntu 20.10 is a solid release and works very well, it is difficult to recommend it to users already running Xubuntu 20.04 LTS due to the lack of any changes. Unless the user needs support for new hardware from the new Linux kernel or has a hot, burning desire to use LibreOffice 7 instead of 6, there really is no compelling reason to upgrade from Xubuntu 20.04 LTS. Comparing the support periods of nine months (until July 2021) for 20.10 versus three years (to April 2023) for 20.04 LTS, again, there isn't much to entice users to switch".

Igor Ljubuncic of Dedoimedo panned the release, writing, "Xubuntu 20.10 simply does not radiate pride, quality and attention to detail that would warrant investment from the user … this feels like a system trapped in time and lethargy".

Xubuntu 21.04

Xubuntu 21.04 is a standard release, made on 22 April 2021.

This release introduced Xfce 4.16 which exclusively uses GTK3. A new minimal installation option was available. It also included two new applications: the HexChat IRC client and the Synaptic package manager as well as some general user interface changes.

A review in Full Circle magazine concluded, "after making no changes in Xubuntu 20.10, it seems that the Xubuntu developers are not going to sit out this entire development cycle. Starting with 21.04, they have introduced some minor refinements. When you have a loyal user following, you need to proceed cautiously. Most Xubuntu users I know love the OS and don't want to see big changes. The result here, in Xubuntu 21.04, is a good solid release that will keep users happy on the road to the next LTS version".

Xubuntu 21.10

Xubuntu 21.10 is a standard release, and was released on 14 October 2021.

This release included the addition of GNOME Disk Analyzer, GNOME Disk Utility, and the media playback software Rhythmbox.

In a review in Softpedia, Vladimir Ciobica praised the inclusion of the new selection of applications in Xubuntu 21.10.

A Full Circle magazine review noted, "Xubuntu 21.10 is a good, solid release with no major notable issues to report. This Xubuntu development cycle has introduced only some minor changes which is not unexpected in a distribution that has been around for 15 years. The Xubuntu developers and its users all seem to agree that they like how it works and no one wants to see any big changes".

Xubuntu 22.04 LTS

This long term support release was made on 21 April 2022 and will be supported for three years until April 2025.

The release uses Xfce 4.16 and the GTK 3.24.33 toolkit. The changes were very minor and included switching Firefox to a snap package from the previous .deb package to align with Ubuntu 22.04 LTS. Updated applications included the addition of spellchecking to the Mousepad text editor along with session backup and restore. The Ristretto image viewer now has improved thumbnail support, along with performance improvements and a new version of the Whisker Menu Plugin adds new customization options with preferences and CSS classes, for theme development.

A review by Ankush Das in It's FOSS News, noted "Xubuntu is one of the most loved Ubuntu flavours…Just like Ubuntu 22.04, Xubuntu 22.04 includes Firefox as a snap package. The snap package can be a secure experience with sandboxing and will get quicker updates by Mozilla".

Xubuntu 22.10

Xubuntu 22.10 was released on 20 October 2022, as an interim release supported for nine months, until July 2023.

This release used Xfce 4.16, with some elements from 4.17 included for testing and preview purposes. The toolkit was GTK 4.8.1. The included default applications saw no changes in what was included, beyond updated versions. Unlike in Ubuntu 22.10 which switched to PipeWire, Xubuntu retained PulseAudio as its sound controller.

Updated applications included the Mousepad 0.5.10 text editor, which included search history and automatic file reloading when a file is externally changed. The Thunar 4.17.9 file manager added native file search functions, including recursive folder searching. The Catfish 4.16.4 desktop search application was redesigned and changes include allowing files located to be opened in a selection of applications from Catfish directly. Many other minor changes to the included applications were also incorporated.

Reviewer Ankush Das of It's FOSS News termed it, "one of the best lightweight Linux distributions available."

Applications
As of the 22.04 LTS release, Xubuntu includes the following applications by default:

Xubuntu includes the GNOME Software storefront which allows users to download additional applications from the Ubuntu repositories.

Table of releases
Xubuntu versions are released twice a year, coinciding with Ubuntu releases. Xubuntu uses the same version numbers and code names as Ubuntu, using the year and month of the release as the version number. The first Xubuntu release, for example, was 6.06, indicating June 2006.

Xubuntu releases are also given code names, using an adjective and an animal with the same first letter, e.g., "Dapper Drake" and "Intrepid Ibex". These are the same as the respective Ubuntu code names. Xubuntu code names are in alphabetical order, allowing a quick determination of which release is newer, although there were no releases with the letters "A" or "C". Commonly, Xubuntu releases are referred to by developers and users by only the adjective portion of the code name, for example Intrepid Ibex is often called just Intrepid.

Long Term Support (LTS) releases are supported for three years, while standard releases are supported for nine months. Prior to 13.04 It had been 18 months.

Derivatives
Xubuntu has been developed into several new versions by third-party developers:

Element OS
A distribution for home theater PCs — discontinued in 2011.
Emmabuntüs
A distribution designed to facilitate the repacking of computers donated to Emmaüs Communities.
GalliumOS
A Linux distribution for ChromeOS devices.
OzOS
A now-defunct Linux distribution based on a severely stripped down version of Xubuntu. Focused on Enlightenment, e17, compiled directly from SVN source. Easy update of e17 is made from SVN updates, by a click on an icon or from CLI using morlenxus' script.
Black Lab Linux (previously OS4 and PC/OS)
A derivative of Xubuntu the interface for which was made to look like BeOS. A 64-bit version was released in May 2009. In 2010 PC/OS moved to more unified look to its parent distribution and a GNOME version was released on 3 March 2010. Renamed Black Lab Linux on 19 November 2013.
UberStudent Linux
A discontinued education-use derivative of Xubuntu LTS releases
UserOS Ultra
A minimal Xubuntu variant was produced for Australia's PC User magazine.
Voyager
A French distribution which comes with the Avant Window Navigator.
ChaletOS
An English distribution similar to the Windows operating system in appearance.

See also
List of Ubuntu-based distributions
Open-source software

References

External links

2006 software
IA-32 Linux distributions
Linux distributions
Operating system distributions bootable from read-only media
Ubuntu derivatives
X86-64 Linux distributions
Xfce